Next Time may refer to:

 "Next Time (Marie Wilson song)" (1998)
 "Next Time (Keyshia Cole song)" (2014)